Events from the year 1971 in Taiwan, Republic of China. This year is numbered Minguo 60 according to the official Republic of China calendar.

Incumbents
 President – Chiang Kai-shek
 Vice President – Yen Chia-kan
 Premier – Yen Chia-kan
 Vice Premier – Chiang Ching-kuo

Events

January
 31 January – The establishment of CTS Main Channel.

April
 21 April – The upgrade of Taoyuan from an urban township to a county-administered city.

July
 15 July – The establishment of Dimerco.

October
 25 October – The United Nations General Assembly expels the Republic of China and admits the People's Republic of China.

December
 3 December – The establishment of China Steel in Taipei.

Births
 13 January – Miao Ke-li, actress, singer and television host
 10 March – Lin Yu-chang, Mayor of Keelung City
 7 May – Chang Sho-wen, member of Legislative Yuan (2005–2009)
 1 June – Chiu Yi-ying, Deputy Minister of Hakka Affairs Council (2005–2008)
 17 July – Yang Ya-che, film and television director
 29 July – Wang Yu-wen, actress
 7 August – Hsiao Bi-khim, member of Legislative Yuan (2002–2008, 2012–2020)
 10 November – Huang Hsiu-fang, member of Legislative Yuan

Deaths
 20 April – Chang Li-sheng, Vice Premier of the Republic of China (1948, 1950–1954)

References

 
Years of the 20th century in Taiwan